The Yurino (Russian: Юpинcкaя, Yurinskaya) is a dual purpose cattle breed from the Russian Federation, particularly the Mari Republic.

References 

Cattle breeds originating in Ukraine
Cattle breeds